The 1958–59 season was Fussball Club Basel 1893's 65th season in their existence. It was their thirteenth consecutive season in the top flight of Swiss football after their promotion from the Nationalliga B the season 1945–46. They played their home games in the Landhof, in the Wettstein Quarter in Kleinbasel. Jules Düblin was the club's chairman for his 13th successive, but final, period. Düblin presided the club during the period July 1946 until Mai 1959 and in the club's history he is the most permanent president that the club has had to date.

Overview 
The Austrian ex-international footballer Rudi Strittich was team manager for the second successive season. The club directors and the team management strengthened the team following the previous disappointing season. Bruno Michaud returned from Lausanne-Sport, Fredy Kehrli, Jean-Jacques Maurer and Charles Turin were hired from Biel-Bienne who had suffered relegation the previous season. Roberto Frigerio was hired from Schaffhausen and Antoine Kohn from Karlsruher SC. But on 30 November 1958 Basel were beaten 0–2 by FC Moutier, a team from the 1 Liga (third highest tier of Swiss football), and because the Basel had lost their previous three league matches this was one bad result too many. Even for club chairman Jules Düblin, who was known as prudent and cautious, this was too much and he replaced Strittich through their ex-trainer René Bader.

Basel played a total of 50 games this season. Of these 50 matches 26 were in the domestic league, two were in the Swiss Cup and 22 were friendly matches. The friendly games resulted with twelve victories, five draws and five defeats. In total, including the test games and the cup competition, 24 games were won, 10 games were drawn and 16 games were lost. In these 50 games the team scored 126 goals and conceded 101.

Fourteen teams contested the 1958–59 Nationalliga A, these were the top 12 teams from the previous season and the two newly promoted teams FC Zürich and FC Luzern. At the end of the season the last two teams in the table were to be relegated. Basel started badly into the new season, losing the first game 1–2 against La Chaux-de-Fonds and then losing at home 1–4 against Grenchen. Then, despite two high wins, 5–0 away against Lausanne-Sport and 6–1 at home against Bellinzona, the afore mentioned three defeats against Young Boys, Zürich and Grasshopper Club caused the change in manager position. But under the new manager things did not change immediately, the lowest point was after round 15 as the team slipped to second last position in the table. But in the last 11 rounds the team lost only one more match and rose in the table to sixth position.

Basel entered the Swiss Cup in the third principal round. They were drawn at home at the Landhof against third tier local team Old Boys. The match was played on 26 October and despite the fact that former Basel goalkeeper Gianfranco de Taddeo, who now played for the Old Boys, held a penalty taken by Hans Weber, Basel won 3–0. In the next round Basel were drawn and lost against FC Moutier. Thus Basel's short and disappointing cup season ended here. As mentioned before, the consequence of this defeat was that team manager Rudi Strittich was fired. Grenchen won the cup this season.

Players 
The following is the list of the Basel first team squad during the season 1958–59. The list includes players that were in the squad on the day that the Nationalliga A season started on 31 August 1958 but subsequently left the club after that date.

 
 
 
 
 
 
 

 

 

Players who left the squad

Results 
Legend

Friendly matches

Pre- and mid-season

Winter break to end of season

Nationalliga A

League matches

League table

Swiss Cup

See also 
 History of FC Basel
 List of FC Basel players
 List of FC Basel seasons

References

Sources 
 Die ersten 125 Jahre. Publisher: Josef Zindel im Friedrich Reinhardt Verlag, Basel. 
 The FCB team 1958–59 at fcb-archiv.ch
 Switzerland 1958–59 by Erik Garin at Rec.Sport.Soccer Statistics Foundation

External links 
 FC Basel official site

FC Basel seasons
Basel